Ian Alan Chipchase (born 26 February 1952) is an English former track and field athlete who competed in the hammer throw. He was the gold medallist in the event at the 1974 British Commonwealth Games with a games' record performance.

He also represented England at the 1978 Commonwealth Games and Great Britain at the 1974 European Athletics Championships.

Career

Chipchase was born in Hebburn in the north of England. He rose to prominence at national level as a junior in 1969 when he won the English Schools Championships, AAA Junior Championships and the British Schools International Match. He retained all of those titles for following year.

His first senior hammer throw title at the North of England Athletics Championships was achieved while he was still a teenager in 1970. He would go on to take that title six times over his career. This stood for eight years until it was beaten by Martin Girvan. He continued to compete while entering higher education and was a three-time champion consecutively at the Universities Athletic Union Championships from 1971 to 1973. At the 1973 AAA Championships he placed third behind Britain's most dominant throwers and 1972 Olympians, Howard Payne and Barry Williams.

Chipchase's career peaked in the 1974 season. He was chosen to represent England at the 1974 British Commonwealth Games and held off both Howard Payne and Peter Farmer to win the gold medal. He competed at the 1974 European Athletics Championships, coming tenth in a field dominated by Soviet and German athletes.

He made only one major international appearance after 1974 – a sixth-place finish at the 1978 Commonwealth Games. He was competitive domestically until the early 1980s, and his achievements include two titles at the Inter-Counties Championships (1978, 1980) and a third place at the 1981 UK Athletics Championships.

Chipchase married Dorothy Swinyard, also an English Commonwealth Games representative.

International competitions

References

Living people
1952 births
People from Hebburn
Sportspeople from Tyne and Wear
British male hammer throwers
English male hammer throwers
Commonwealth Games gold medallists for England
Commonwealth Games medallists in athletics
Athletes (track and field) at the 1974 British Commonwealth Games
Athletes (track and field) at the 1978 Commonwealth Games
Medallists at the 1974 British Commonwealth Games